Herman Johan Christiaan Berendsen (22 September 1934 – 7 October 2019) was a Dutch chemist. He was a professor of physical chemistry at the University of Groningen from 1967 to 1999.

Career
Berendsen was born on 22 September 1934 in Apeldoorn. In 1962 he obtained his PhD cum laude from the University of Groningen, with a dissertation titled: "An NMR study of collagen hydration". In March 1963 Berendsen was appointed lector of physical chemistry at his alma mater, and four years later became full professor. He retired in 1999. At Groningen Berendsen was group leader of molecular dynamics.

In 1976 Berendsen and Wilfred van Gunsteren together with the 2013 Nobel Prize in Chemistry winners Martin Karplus and Michael Levitt were involved in the start of theories on molecular calculating.

Berendsen was elected a member of the Royal Netherlands Academy of Arts and Sciences in 1979. In 2013 he was awarded the Berni J. Alder Prize by the Centre européen de calcul atomique et moléculaire. The jury amongst other points praised his development of the GROMOS type of force field.

References

External links
 Personal website of Berendsen
 Profile at the Mathematics Genealogy Project

1934 births
2019 deaths
Dutch physical chemists
Members of the Royal Netherlands Academy of Arts and Sciences
People from Apeldoorn
University of Groningen alumni
Academic staff of the University of Groningen